Bicyclus madetes, the brown-spot bush brown, is a butterfly in the family Nymphalidae. It is found in Guinea, Sierra Leone, Liberia, Ivory Coast, Ghana, Togo, Nigeria, Cameroon, Gabon and the Democratic Republic of the Congo. The habitat consists of forests, including severely degraded forests.

The larvae feed on Poaceae species.

Subspecies
Bicyclus madetes madetes (Guinea, Sierra Leone, Liberia, Ivory Coast, Ghana, Togo, southern Nigeria, western Cameroon, Gabon)
Bicyclus madetes carola d'Abrera, 1980 (Cameroon: west of the mountains, Democratic Republic of the Congo: the Kasai)

Variations in spot patterns
B. m. madetes in Ghana

References

Elymniini
Butterflies described in 1874
Butterflies of Africa
Taxa named by William Chapman Hewitson